The National Independence Federation (KNP) was a centrist political party in South Korea.

History
The party was established by Kim Kyu-sik. Due to Kim's opposition to the holding of in South Korea separate to those in the north, it boycotted the 1948 Constitutional Assembly elections. It did contest the 1950 parliamentary elections, winning a single seat.

Election results

House of Representatives

References

Defunct political parties in South Korea